Life Is may refer to 

Life Is..., a 2003 album by Ken Hirai
Life Is...Too Short, the second studio album by Too Short 1988

See also